Chalcothea smaragdina is a species of flower chafer belonging to the family scarab beetles.

Description
The body is oblong, with distinct "neck" between head and pronotum. Elytra are metallic green and much broader than pronotum.

Distribution
This species is present in the Southeast Asia (Indonesia, Malaysia, Sumatra).

References

External links
 Macroid

Cetoniinae
Fauna of Southeast Asia
Beetles described in 1833